Till the End may refer to:

"Till the End", song by Toto from Fahrenheit
Till the End (Brooke Duff song)
Till the End (Vern Gosdin song)
Till the End (album), a 2015 album and title track by Phinehas
"Til the End", a 2004 song by Lloyd Banks from The Hunger for More
"Til the End", a 2010 song by Tinchy Stryder from Third Strike
"'Til the End", a 2015 song by Jeremy Camp from I Will Follow

See also
 Until the End (disambiguation)